State Route 171 (SR 171, named Broadway Avenue) is a  long state highway serving the city of Moses Lake in Grant County, located in the U.S. state of Washington. Broadway Avenue begins at an interchange with Interstate 90 (I-90) and travels northeast through Downtown Moses Lake concurrent to Interstate 90 Business and parallel to Parker Horn before ending at an intersection with SR 17. Broadway Avenue was previously part of Primary State Highway 18 (PSH 18) and U.S. Route 10 (US 10) until the 1964 highway renumbering. The highway also has an un-built extension from Moses Lake northeast to Odessa that was first legislated in 1955 as Secondary State Highway 7E (SSH 7E).

Route description

The street travels north over a branch of the Columbia Basin Railroad into Downtown Moses Lake and turns northeast to parallel the Parker Horn before the split between SR 171 and I-90 Business, which becomes Pioneer Way. The highway continues northeast to leave Downtown Moses Lake and end at an intersection with SR 17, which bypasses the city.

Every year the Washington State Department of Transportation (WSDOT) conducts a series of surveys on its highways in the state to measure traffic volume. This is expressed in terms of average annual daily traffic (AADT), which is a measure of traffic volume for any average day of the year. In 2011, WSDOT calculated that between 3,900 and 21,000 vehicles per day used the highway, mostly in the Yakima area.

History

Broadway Avenue was originally part of Primary State Highway 18 (PSH 18), which extended from George to Ritzville. PSH 18 was created in 1937 and crossed the western part of Moses Lake into Downtown Moses Lake on a bridge that was built in 1924. U.S. Route 10 (US 10) was re-routed onto PSH 18 in the 1940s, and both highways began using a proposed southern bypass of the city in 1955. A road connecting Moses Lake to Odessa in the northeast was proposed in the late 1940s, and was signed into law in 1955 as Secondary State Highway 7E. Interstate 90 (I-90) replaced US 10 and PSH 18 during the creation of the Interstate Highway System in 1956, and SSH 7E was replaced by State Route 171 (SR 171) in a 1964 renumbering. No major revisions to the highway have occurred since 1964, and the route to Odessa remains un-built .

Major intersections

References

External links

Highways of Washington State

171
Transportation in Grant County, Washington